Judge Boyd may refer to:

James Edmund Boyd (1845–1935), judge of the United States District Court for the Western District of North Carolina
Sir John Alexander Boyd (1837–1916), judge of the High Court of Justice of the Province of Ontario
John Frank Boyd (1853–1945), judge of the Ninth Judicial District Court of Nebraska
Marion Speed Boyd (1900–1988), judge of the United States District Court for the Western District of Tennessee

See also
Justice Boyd (disambiguation)